Kirriemuir is hamlet in east-central Alberta, Canada within Special Area No. 4.

Kirriemuir has a hall, a small general store with a post office and gas station, a playground, and two ball diamonds.  The hamlet draws children from the greater area to participate on its softball teams during the summer months. One of the more popular events each year is the annual discing bonspiel, which is held at the Kirriemuir Hall. An older Alberta Wheat Pool grain elevator remains standing at the edge of the community and it is still in use, but by private owners as the railroad tracks have long since been removed.

The hamlet was named after Kirriemuir in Scotland.

Demographics 
Kirriemuir recorded a population of 28 in the 1991 Census of Population conducted by Statistics Canada.

See also 
List of communities in Alberta
List of hamlets in Alberta

References 

Hamlets in Alberta
Special Area No. 4